A baggage carousel is a device, generally at an airport, that delivers checked luggage to the passengers at the baggage reclaim area at their final destination. Not all airports use these devices. Airports without carousels generally deliver baggage by placing it on the floor or sliding it through an opening in a wall.

Operation

Bags are placed on some type of conveyor belt in a secure area not accessible by passengers.

In a single-level system, the belt will deliver bags into the terminal from an opening in the wall. The belt generally runs along the wall for a short distance and then turns into the terminal forming a long oval that allows many passengers to access the belt. The belt continues back to the loading area through a second opening in the wall.

In a multilevel system, the bags are generally loaded from above or below the carousel and then delivered onto a moving oval-shaped carousel. It is common for this type of system to have two delivery belts, increasing the speed with which bags can be delivered to the passenger level.

There is also a variety of carousel that is a combination of the two systems. These occur mainly in Europe. Bags are loaded from an upper level and end up on the rotating carousel, as is normal. However, the very back portion of the oval, in this case, runs in and out of the wall, so it can be accessed by baggage handlers.

Exceptions
Commonly, the following types of checked baggage are not placed on a baggage carousel:
Golf clubs in golf bags
Surfboards
Wheelchairs
Bicycles
Baby strollers 
Child car seats 
Skis

These items are delivered in many ways including:
Placing them on the floor
Delivered through a special opening
Picked up at the customer service office
Placed in special racks (common in ski area destinations)

See also

Ground support equipment
Lost Luggage (video game)

References

Airport infrastructure
Luggage
Aircraft ground handling